The genus Anchusa belongs to the borage family (Boraginaceae). It includes about 35 species found growing in Europe, North Africa, South Africa and Western Asia. They are introduced in the United States.

They consist of annual plants, biennial plants and perennial plants with the general characteristics of the borage family. They are commonly herbaceous. The leaves are simple or undulate, covered with stiff hairs.

The small radially symmetrical flowers are sapphire blue and retain their colour a long time. The plants show numerous flowers with five sepals, united at their bases, and five petals forming a narrow tube facing upwards. The flowers grow in several axillary cymes, simple or branched, or are clustered at the end. The flowers are much frequented by bees.

The genus Anchusa is commonly used in trough or rock gardens.

The roots of Anchusa (just like those of Alkanna and Lithospermum) contain anchusin (or alkanet-red), a red-brown resinoid colouring matter. It is insoluble in water, but soluble in alcohol, chloroform and ether.

Anchusa species are used as food plants by the larvae of some Lepidoptera species including Coleophora pennella.

Taxonomy 

There are four subgenera: Buglossum, Buglossoides, Buglossellum and Anchusa.

The first two form one subclade, the other two each a separate subclade. The subclade of the subgenus Anchusa (containing Anchusa capensis) is largely unresolved.

If we consider Anchusa s.l., then it includes the subgenus Limbata, which diverges markedly in its floral morphology.

The subgenera Buglossum, Buglossellum and Buglossoides clearly need new independent entities, while the subgenus Anchusa needs a narrower concept. This way taxonomy and phylogeny with respect to Anchusa can become completely analogous.

The following genera are synonyms for Anchusa: Buglossum Mill., Hormuzakia Gusul, Lycopsis L. and Phyllocara Gusul. The genus Anchusella Bigazzi et al. is sometimes included in Anchusa.

Species 
Anchusa aegyptiaca (L.) A. DC.
Anchusa aggregata Lehm.
Anchusa arvensis (L.) M.Bieb.: small bugloss, bugloss, annual bugloss
Anchusa atlantica Ball
Anchusa aucheri A. DC.
Anchusa azurea P.Mill.: Italian bugloss, large blue alkanet
Anchusa barrelieri (All.) Vitman: Barrelier's bugloss
Anchusa caespitosa Lam.
Anchusa calcarea Boiss.
Anchusa capellii Moris
Anchusa capensis Thunb.: Cape bugloss, Cape forget-me-not
Anchusa cretica Miller
Anchusa crispa Viv. (status vulnerable to endangered in France and Italy)
Anchusa davidovii Stoj.
Anchusa formosa sp. nov.: (Sardinia)
Anchusa gmelinii Ledeb.
Anchusa hispida Forsskål
Anchusa hybrida Ten.
Anchusa italica Retz.
Anchusa leptophylla Roemer & Schultes
Anchusa leucantha sp. nov. (Greece)
Anchusa littorea Moris
Anchusa macedonica Degen & Dörfler
Anchusa mairei Gusuleac
Anchusa milleri Sprengel
Anchusa ochroleuca M.Bieb.: yellow alkanet
Anchusa officinalis L.: true alkanet, bugloss, common bugloss, corn bugloss, field bugloss (type species)
 A. officinalis L. ssp. intacta (Griseb.) Selvi & Bigazz
Anchusa ovata Lehm.
Anchusa procera Besser
Anchusa pseudogranatensis (Br.-Bl. & Maire) Sennen & Mauricio
Anchusa puechii Valdés
Anchusa pusilla Gusuleac
Anchusa samothracica
Anchusa sartorii Gusuleac
Anchusa sempervirens: evergreen alkanet
Anchusa spruneri Boiss.
Anchusa strigosa Banks & Sol.
Anchusa stylosa M.Bieb.
 A. stylosa M.Bieb. ssp. spruneri (Boiss.) Selvi & Bigazzi
Anchusa subglabra A. Caballero
Anchusa thessala
Anchusa tiberiadis Post
Anchusa undulata L.
 A. undulata subsp. granatensis (Boiss.) Valdés
 A. undulata subsp. lamprocarpa Br.-Bl. & Maire
 A. undulata subsp. viciosoi Laínz
 A. undulata ssp. sartorii (Gu ul.) Selvi & Bigazzi
Anchusa variegata (L.) Lehm.
Anchusa velenovskii (Gusuleac) Stoj.

References

 "Molecular Systematics of Boraginaceae Tribe Boragineae Based on ITS1 and trnL Sequences, with Special Reference to Anchusa s.l.; Hilger et al.". Annals of Botany. 2004; 94: 201-212.

 
Boraginaceae genera